Gambling House is a 1951 American film noir crime film directed by Ted Tetzlaff and starring Victor Mature, Terry Moore and William Bendix.

Plot
A gangster, Joe Farrow, kills a man after a game of craps. He then offers gambler Marc Fury $50,000 if he will take the rap and stand trial. Farrow tries to renege on the money, so Fury steals a ledger with information that could put Farrow behind bars. While being pursued, Fury slips the ledger into the possession of an immigration social worker, Lynn Warren.

Subsequently, Fury is acquitted but immigration officers arrest him, take him to Ellis Island and threaten to deport him; neither he nor his parents ever become naturalized citizens. Fury tracks down Lynn Warren and, though the two are drawn romantically to each other, she does not believe his desire to remain in America is well-placed.

Farrow's gunman comes looking for Fury, but ultimately double-crosses his boss. When Fury offers the $50,000 to a family that longs desperately to remain in America, Lynn begins to trust him.

Cast
 Victor Mature as Marc Fury
 Terry Moore as Lynn Warren
 William Bendix as Joe Farrow
 Zachary Charles as Willie (as Zachary A. Charles)
 Basil Ruysdael as Judge Ravinek
 Donald Randolph as Lloyd Crane
 Damian O'Flynn as Ralph Douglas
 Cleo Moore as Sally
 Ann Doran as Della 
 Eleanor Audley as Mrs. Livingston
 Gloria Winters as B.J. Warren
 Don Haggerty as Sharky

Production
The story was originally called Mr Whiskas. It was purchased by RKO in 1947 and scheduled in 1948 as a vehicle for Victor Mature, who had a contract with RKO to make one film a year. However the project was postponed to enable Mature to make Easy Living. In July 1949 it was announced he would make Mr Whiskas next. Warren Duff was to write and produce.

In late 1949 the project was renamed Alias Mike Fury. Mature refused to make the movie and was put on suspension by Fox. The script was rewritten and Mature ended up making the film, which was retitled Gambling House. Filming started February 1950.

Reception
When first released, critic Bosley Crowther panned the film. He wrote, "Don't look for very rich pickings in R. K. O.'s Gambling House, a run-of-the-mill melodrama that came to the Mayfair on Saturday. Your chances for solid satisfaction from this tale of a crook who goes straight after meeting a decent young lady are about as good as they would be from a fixed wheel ... Put it down as claptrap and the performance of Mr. Mature as another demonstration of an actor doing the best he can with a bad role. Miss Moore is entirely incidental and William Bendix is mulishly mean as the tough and deceitful rascal who crosses up Mr. Mature. To say any more about it might tend to incriminate somebody."

References

External links
 
 
 
 

1951 films
1951 crime films
American crime films
American black-and-white films
Film noir
Films scored by Roy Webb
RKO Pictures films
1950s English-language films
1950s American films